William Walsh (26 September 188821 April 1964) was an Irish hurler, selector and Gaelic games administrator. At club level he played with Sarsfields and was also a member of the Cork senior hurling team. He usually lined out as a corner-back.

Career

Born in Little Island, Walsh first came to prominence as a hurler with the Sarsfields club in nearby Glanmire. He first appeared on the inter-county scene as a member of the Cork senior hurling team during the 1910 Munster Championship. Walsh was a regular member of the team over the following few seasons and won two Munster Championship medals. He also lined out in All-Ireland final defeats by Kilkenny in 1912 and Laois in 1915. Walsh's last game for Cork was the 1916 Munster final defeat by Tipperary.

Post-playing career

Walsh was the Sarsfields representative on the Cork County Board for a number of years and was Cork’s Munster Council representative from 1931 to 1939. He was elected vice-chairman of the Cork County Board in 1937 before serving as chairman from 1941 to 1946 when he was defeated in an election at the County Convention. Walsh's tenure as chairman saw the Cork senior team claim five All-Ireland Championships in six seasons, including a record-breaking four-in-a-row. He was a selector for the title wins in 1941, 1943 and 1944. After being defeated for the chairmanship Walsh served one more year on the General Purposes Committee before standing down from his administrative duties.

Personal life

Walsh's niece married Willie Cummins, who had also lined out with the Cork senior hurling team. His grandnephews, Kevin, Ray and Brendan, all lined out with Cork at various levels from the 1960s until the 1980s. The Cork Premier Intermediate Hurling Championship cup is named in Walsh's honour.

Honours

Player

 Munster Senior Hurling Championship: 1912, 1915

Selector

 All-Ireland Senior Hurling Championship: 1941, 1943, 1944
 Munster Senior Hurling Championship: 1943, 1944

References

1888 births
1964 deaths
Sarsfields (Cork) hurlers
Cork inter-county hurlers
Hurling selectors
Gaelic games administrators